Tram route 0 was a tram route in Saint Petersburg, Russia. 

On the route cars from the Museum of Electrical Transport of model of Brush #1028 (1931) and picking up of cars MS-4#2424 MSP-3#2384 (both - 1932) worked. 
Movement was carried out from 10 o'clock till 21 o'clock from July, 3rd, 2006 till the end of August, 2006.

Tram routes in Saint Petersburg